Bozhidar Katsarov (born 30 December 1993) is a Bulgarian professional footballer who plays as a midfielder for Lokomotiv Sofia.

References

External links 
 

1993 births
Living people
Bulgarian footballers
FC Pirin Razlog players
FC Septemvri Sofia players
FC Tsarsko Selo Sofia players
SFC Etar Veliko Tarnovo players
FC Lokomotiv 1929 Sofia players
First Professional Football League (Bulgaria) players
Association football midfielders
Sportspeople from Stara Zagora